Canada–Colombia relations are foreign relations between Canada and the Republic of Colombia. Full direct diplomatic relations were established in 1953, with the exchange of the first ambassadors. Canada has an embassy in Bogotá. Colombia has an embassy in Ottawa and 4 Consulates-General (in Toronto, Montreal, Vancouver and Calgary). Both countries are full members of the Organization of American States.

Trade 

The top exports from Colombia to Canada are coffee, bananas, coal and fuel.

In 2010 Canada officially entered into the Canada-Colombia Free Trade agreement previously signed in 2008.  The news was announced by Prime Minister Stephen Harper in Bogotá, Colombia.  The agreement officially took effect August 15, 2011.  In 2008, the two countries signed a new $1.14 billion dollar bilateral trade agreement (the Canada-Colombia Free Trade Agreement) at the Asia-Pacific Economic Cooperation meeting. The agreement has led to exchanges of such products including wheat, pulses, barley, paper and heavy equipment and helps the manufacturing and financial industries. Part of the agreement includes Colombia's elimination of child labour, forced labour and workplace discrimination and will eliminate double taxation. Colombia will also eliminate 98% of tariffs on good exported to Canada by 2018.

Foreign Aid 
The Canadian government announced in February 2009 that it was adding Colombia to its list of preferred countries to receive foreign aid. This list includes 18 countries and the West Bank and Caribbean.  In 2016, following the negotiation of the peace agreement between the Colombian government and FARC rebels, Canada offered $21M to "help Colombia make peace deal stick."  The funds are designated mainly for National Police training programs, rapid response to "local flare-ups that might threaten the peace," as well as for de-mining. With other world leaders, Global Affairs Minister Stéphane Dion travelled to Cartagena for the signing ceremony. Canada sent observers to witness the referendum, which ended with a rejection of the agreement by a majority of Colombian voters.

See also 
Colombian Canadian

References

External links
Canadian Ministry of Foreign Affairs and International Trade about the relations with Colombia
Canadian embassy in Bogotá
Colombian embassy in Ottawa

 
Colombia
Canada